15th Army or Fifteenth Army may refer to:

 15th Army (Wehrmacht), a formation of the German Army during World War II
 Fifteenth Army (Japan), a formation of the Imperial Japanese Army during World War II
 Japanese Fifteenth Area Army, a formation of the Imperial Japanese Army during World War II
 15th Army (People's Republic of China), former name of the Chinese People's Liberation Army's 15th Airborne Corps
 15th Army (RSFSR)
 15th Army (Soviet Union)
 15th Army Group, a combined formation of the United Kingdom and United States armies during World War II
 Fifteenth United States Army, a formation of the United States Army during World War II

See also
XV Corps (disambiguation)
15th Division (disambiguation)
15th Group (disambiguation)
15th Wing (disambiguation)
15th Brigade (disambiguation)
15th Regiment (disambiguation)
15 Squadron (disambiguation)